Josep Pla i Agustí  (c. 1728 – 1762) was a Spanish composer from Catalonia. He was the youngest of three composer-brothers: his older brother Joan Baptista Pla (1720–1773), was an oboist in Lisbon, and another older brother, Manuel Pla (c. 1725–1766), was harpsichordist at the court of Madrid.

Works, editions and recordings
 Stabat Mater – recording Raquel Andueza, soprano, Pau Bordas, bass, Orquestra Barroca Catalana, dir. Olivia Centurioni, LMG 2011.
 Tono divino – Pedro, cuánto has dejado por seguir a tu maestro.

References

Bibliography
Dolcet, Josep. "L'obra dels germans Pla, bases per a una catalogació," Anuario Musical v. 42 (1987), p. 131–188. (includes thematic catalog of works)

1720s births
1762 deaths
Year of birth uncertain
18th-century classical composers
18th-century male musicians
Spanish Baroque composers
Spanish male classical composers
Composers from Catalonia